Jacques Deray (born Jacques Desrayaud; 19 February 1929 – 9 August 2003) was a French film director and screenwriter. Deray is prominently known for directing many crime and thriller films.

Biography
Born Jacques Desrayaud in Lyon, France, in 1929 to a family of Lyon industrialists. At the age of 19 he went to Paris to study drama under René Simon. Deray played minor roles on the stage and in films from the age of 19. From 1952, Deray worked as assistant to a number of directors, including Luis Buñuel, Gilles Grangier, Jules Dassin, and Jean Boyer.

Deray's first film was the drama Le Gigolo released in 1960. Deray was fascinated by  American film noir and began to focus on crime stories. Deray's early work includes Du rififi à Tokyo, an homage to Jules Dassin's Rififi. Deray's reputation was established with the 1969 film La Piscine which starred Romy Schneider and Alain Delon. La Piscine was not distributed widely outside France, but the follow-up gave Deray his biggest international hit with Borsalino, a film starring Delon and Jean-Paul Belmondo about two small-time gangsters who murder their way to the top in bustling 1930s Marseilles.

Deray became dedicated to the genre that won him favor with audiences and continued to make thrillers, action films, and spy films throughout the rest of his career adapting works of both French and English authors including Georges Simenon, Jean-Patrick Manchette, and Derek Raymond. In 1981, Deray served as president of the jury of the 34th Cannes Film Festival. Deray's last theatrical release was L'Ours en peluche in 1994. Deray worked professionally in television until his death in 2003. On his death, French President Jacques Chirac praised Deray, noting his "innate sense of storytelling and action" and adding that "France has lost one of its most talented filmmakers."

Jacques Deray Prize 

Created by in 2005 to honor Deray, who served as vice-president of the Institut Lumière until his death, the Jacques Deray Prize rewards the best French crime-thriller film of the year. Among the first laureates are 36 Quai des Orfèvres by Olivier Marchal, The Beat That My Heart Skipped by Jacques Audiard, Tell No One by Guillaume Canet, The Second Wind by Alain Corneau, and later Polisse by Maïwenn (2012).

Filmography 

 1960 : Le Gigolo
 1963 : Rififi in Tokyo 
 1963 : 
 1965 : Par un beau matin d'été
 1966 : To Skin a Spy
 1966 : That Man George
 1969 : La Piscine
 1970 : Borsalino
 1971 : Doucement les basses
 1971 : Un peu de soleil dans l'eau froide
 1972 : The Outside Man
 1974 : Borsalino & Co.
 1975 : Flic Story
 1977 : Le Gang
 1978 : Butterfly on the Shoulder
 1980 : Three Men to Kill (Trois hommes à abattre)
 1983 : Le Marginal
 1985 : He Died with His Eyes Open
 1987 : Le Solitaire
 1987 : Maladie d'amour
 1989 : Les Bois noirs
 1991 : Contre l'oubli (film collectif)
 1991 : Netchaïev est de retour
 1993 : 
 1994 : 3000 scénarios contre un virus (segment « Arnaud et ses copains »)
 1994 : L'Ours en peluche
 1998 :  (TV movie)
 2000 : On n'a qu'une vie (TV movie)
 2001 : Lettre d'une inconnue (TV movie)

References

External links
 

1929 births
2003 deaths
French film directors
Mass media people from Lyon
Deaths from cancer in France